Dánica Nishimura Higa (born 11 September 1996) is a Peruvian badminton player.

Career 
Nishimura started playing badminton at aged 10 in AELU club. In 2008 she competed in the junior event and at the same year, she joined the national team. In 2013, she won the bronze medal at the Pan Am Badminton Championships in women's doubles partnering with Daniela Macías, then in 2016, she won the bronze medals in the women's doubles and mixed team events.

Nishimura claimed two gold medals in the individual event at the 2018 South American Games in the women's and mixed doubles, and also helped the team clinch the silver medal.

Achievements

Pan Am Championships 
Women's doubles

South American Games 
Women's doubles

Mixed doubles

BWF International Challenge/Series (23 titles, 13 runners-up) 
Women's singles

Women's doubles

Mixed doubles

  BWF International Challenge tournament
  BWF International Series tournament
  BWF Future Series tournament

References

External links 

 
 

1996 births
Living people
Sportspeople from Lima
Peruvian people of Japanese descent
Peruvian female badminton players
Badminton players at the 2015 Pan American Games
Badminton players at the 2019 Pan American Games
Pan American Games competitors for Peru
Competitors at the 2018 South American Games
South American Games gold medalists for Peru
South American Games silver medalists for Peru
South American Games medalists in badminton